14th Street NW/SW is a street in Northwest and Southwest quadrants of Washington, D.C., located  west of the U.S. Capitol. It runs from the 14th Street Bridge north to Eastern Avenue.

Northbound U.S. Route 1 runs along 14th Street from the bridge to Constitution Avenue, where it turns east with US 50. US 1 southbound previously used 15th Street NW due to the ban on left turns from westbound Constitution Avenue to 14th Street, but it now uses the Ninth Street Tunnel, five blocks to the east. 14th Street crosses the National Mall and runs near the White House and through the western side of Washington's Logan Circle neighborhood.

Because it connects to one of the main bridges crossing the Potomac River into Virginia, 14th Street has always been a major transportation corridor.  It was the location of one of the first streetcar lines, and today it is the location of several afternoon carpooling "slug lines", which allow commuters to meet the high-occupancy vehicle requirements of I-395, the Henry G. Shirley Memorial Highway.

History
In the middle of the 20th century, 14th Street NW near the intersection of P Street was home to many car dealerships and was known as "auto row". The Casino Royal at 14th and H Streets was one of the city's most popular nightclubs.
The street was the location of race riots in 1968 after the assassination of Martin Luther King Jr.

In the 1970s and1980s, a portion of 14th Street became known primarily for its red-light district. Several strip clubs and massage parlors were concentrated roughly between New York Avenue and K Street, while prostitutes plied their trade around Logan Circle. However, rising land values eventually pushed out the adult businesses.  The Source Theatre, founded by Bart Whiteman, was given some credit for the area's revival.  Whiteman stood outside the theater to escort people inside in order to make them feel safer. The opening of a Whole Foods Market at 14th and P Streets in 2000 is also considered a major turning point for the neighborhood.

With the gentrification of the neighborhoods through which it passes – particularly downtown, Logan Circle, the U Street Corridor, and Columbia Heights – 14th Street is now known for live theater, art galleries, and trendy restaurants. Moreover, while the nominal center of the city's gay life is still Dupont Circle, the Washington Blade called 14th Street between U Street and Massachusetts Avenue (Thomas Circle) the best place to see and be seen. As of 2012, the center of gravity had shifted and Logan Circle was voted "DC's gay neighborhood."

14th Street, especially south of Florida Avenue, is rapidly gentrifying and now known as one of the preeminent dining destinations in the Greater Washington area. In a nine-month period alone between 2012 and 2013, 24 new restaurants opened on 14th Street.

Landmarks

Armenian Genocide Museum of America
The Black Cat
Columbia Heights Metro station
DC USA
Freedom Plaza
Garfinckel's
John A. Wilson Building
National Aquarium
National City Christian Church
National Museum of American History
National Press Building
Oscar Straus Memorial
Pershing Park
Ronald Reagan Building
Thomas Circle
Tivoli Theatre
United States Department of Commerce
United States Holocaust Memorial Museum
Walter Reed Army Medical Center
Willard InterContinental Washington

Transit service
Fourteenth Street has been a major transit route ever since the Capital Traction Company streetcar line was built around the turn of the 20th century.  The successor to that line is the Metrobus 14th Street Line—routes 52 & 54.

Rail

There are two Metrorail stations on 14th Street (the U Street station is one block east, at 13th and U Streets NW and is considered the most convenient stop to visit the heart of 14th St between P and V Sts NW):
 McPherson Square   
 Columbia Heights

Bus

Metrobus
The following Metrobus routes travel along the street (listed from south to north):
 11Y (Eye St. NW to the 14th Street Bridge)
 16C (Independence Ave to the 14th Street Bridge)
 16E (Franklin Square to the 14th Street Bridge)
 52 (Takoma or 14th St & Colorado Ave. to L'Enfant Plaza)
 54 (Takoma to Metro Center)
 59 (Takoma to Federal Triangle)
 E4 (Military Rd. to Kennedy St.)

DC Circulator
The DC Circulator's Woodley Park–Adams Morgan–McPherson Square Metro bus line travels along 14th Street between Columbia Heights and Franklin Square.

References

Streets in Washington, D.C.
014
Historic districts on the National Register of Historic Places in Washington, D.C.
Dupont Circle
Auto rows
Roads on the National Register of Historic Places in Washington, D.C.
Shopping districts and streets in Washington, D.C.
Motor vehicle buildings and structures on the National Register of Historic Places